Thokozile is a 1986 hit by the South African mbaqanga group Mahlathini and the Mahotella Queens. The album was a reunion of Mahlathini with the backing Makgona Tsohle Band and three of the original Queens, Hilda Tloubatla, Nobesuthu Mbadu and Mildred Mangxola. The album (#Gallo-GRC BL 590) featured re-recordings of older songs such as "Umculo Kawupheli" (heard here as "Sibuyile") and "Sithunyiwe" (here "Thokozile"). The album propelled the group into immediate international stardom when it was issued internationally on the Earthworks label.

Track listing
 "Thokozile" ("Praise/Be Happy")
 "Lilizela Mlilizeli" ("Ululate/Applaud")
 "Sibuyile" ("We Are Back")
 "Nina Majuba" ("You Pigeons")
 "I Wanna Dance"
 "Uyavutha Umlilo" ("Music Inferno")
 "Sengikhala Ngiyabaleka" ("I'm Crying and Running Away")
 "Izulu Liyaduduma" ("Thunderstorm")

Mahlathini and the Mahotella Queens albums
1987 albums